Into Eternity is the eponymous debut studio album by the Canadian metal band, Into Eternity. The album was originally self-released by the band in 1999, then was re-released by DVS Records in 2000 with different coverart and one bonus track. The DVS version enlists Daniel Nargang (who would later share guitar and vocal duties with Tim Roth on the band's 2001 follow up Dead or Dreaming) on guitar instead of Chris Eisler. The album is intertwined with audio excerpts from the 1994 film Pulp Fiction.

Track listing
 All song's written, performed and arranged by Into Eternity
 All lyrics written by Tim Roth
 All songs 1999 Into Eternity

Personnel
Credits are adapted from the album's liner notes. 

Into Eternity
 Tim Roth – lead vocals, guitar
 Chris McDougall – keyboards
 Jim Austin – drums, vocals
 Scott Krall – bass, vocals
 Chris Eisler – guitar (on original release)
 Daniel Nargang – guitar (on 2000 re-release)

Production and other
 Recorded & Mixed – May to October 1998 at Touchwood Studios, Regina, SK, Canada
 Produced by Into Eternity and Grant Hall
 Mixed and Mastered by Grant (lick me where I ...) Hall and Into Eternity
 Artwork, Logo & Layout by Mattias Norén, 
 Band photo by Brent Stevenson

References 

1999 debut albums
Into Eternity (band) albums